Arpadites is a genus of ceratitids in the family Trachyceratidae from the Middle and Upper Triassic (Ladinian and Carnian stages) of Nevada (United States), Alps, Italy, Balkans, Himalayas, and Japan. (Arkel et al. 1962, L162)

The genotype Arpadites arpadis came from the upper Middle Triassic (Ladinian) of the Alps in Europe.

Description 
Arpadites, named by Mojsisovics, 1879, is characterized by a compressed, evolute, discoidal shell with radial or faintly sigmoidal  ribs; smooth, continuous keels; umbilical tubercles, with or without lateral and ventrolateral tubercles as well; and ceratitic sutures with two lateral lobes (on either side).

Gallery

References

Further reading 
 Arkel et al., 1962. Mesozoic Ammonoidea, Treatise on Invertebrate Paleontology Part L, Mollusca 4, R.C. Moore (ed)
 N. Fantini Sestini. 1994. The Ladinian ammonoids from the Calcare di Esino of Val Parina (Bergamasc Alps, Northern Italy). Part. 1. Rivista Italiana di Paleontologia e Stratigrafia 100(2):227-284
 J. J., J.r. Sepkoski. 2002. A compendium of fossil marine animal genera. Bulletins of American Paleontology 363:1-560

Middle Triassic ammonites
Ceratitida genera
Ammonites of Europe
Ladinian first appearances
Carnian extinctions
Late Triassic ammonites
Trachyceratidae